Ethnonyms of the Ingush — names of Ingush people, including self-names (endonyms) and names used by other ethnic groups to refer to the Ingush (exonyms) throughout the existence of Ingush people from Middle Ages to the modern day.

Endonyms 

Ghalghaï is the self-name of the Ingush. Some scholars associate it with the ancient Gargareans and Gelaï mentioned in the 1st century in the work of the ancient historian and geographer Strabo.

Loamaro — self-name of the Ingush. Loamaro is composition of Loam (Mountain) and -(a)ro suffix, the word literally translates as "Mountaineer" in Ingush language.

Exonyms 
Durdzuks, also known as Dzurdzuks — medieval ethnonym of Georgian origin for the Nakh peoples. First mention of Durdzuks can be found in the 7th-century work Geography of Armenia by Anania Shirakatsi as the Dourtsk.

Kistins or Kists — exonym of all Nakh peoples for the most of the part, however in some sources, it was used for only the Ingushes living in Armkhi Gorge (also called Kistin Gorge).

Gligvi — medieval ethnonym used in Georgian, Russian and Western European sources in the 16th-19th centuries. The ethnonym corresponds to the self-name of the Ingush - Ghalghaï.

Ghilgho — medieval ethnonym used in Georgian sources, specifially by neighbouring Khevsurs, Pshavis and Tushins, mentioned in the works of the first Tsova-Tushin writer Ivan Tsiskarishvili (Tsiskarov), and famous poets Vazha Pshavela and Gabriel Jabushanuri. The ethnonym corresponds to the self-name of the Ingush - Ghalghaï.

Erokhan people — ethnonym mentioned in Russian sources of 16-17th centuries. The ethnonym corresponds to Dzherakhs.

Kalkans (also Kolkans, Kalki, Kolki, Kalkan people) — ethnonym of the Ingush used in Russian sources of the 16th-17th centuries. The ethnonym corresponds to the self-name of the Ingush — Ghalghaï.

Ğalğayal — to the Avars. The ethnonym corresponds to the self-name of the Ingush - Ghalghaï.

Ğalğayol — to the Andi people. The ethnonym corresponds to the self-name of the Ingush - Ghalghaï.

Kalghaï — to the Kumyks. The ethnonym corresponds to the self-name of the Ingush - Ghalghaï.

Khulgha — to the Ossetians, refers to the country of the Ingush. The ethnonym corresponds to the self-name of the Ingush - Ghalghaï.

Mækhæl — to the Ossetians, initially referred to neighbouring Ingush clans who lived in the area of Armkhi. The ethnonym derives from the word 'mækhæl' (guard bird) and is linked to the Ingush village Erzi, which translates as 'eagle'.

Ingush (also Ingushevs, Angushi, Angushtins) — to the Kabardins, adapted by Russians in the 18th century. The ethnonym derives from the village Angusht.

References

Bibliography 
 
 
 
 
 
 
 
 
 
 
 
 
 
 
 
 
 
 

History of Ingushetia
Ethnonyms
Ingush people